Bansgaon is a constituency of the Uttar Pradesh Legislative Assembly covering the city of Bansgaon in the Gorakhpur district of Uttar Pradesh, India.

Bansgaon is one of five assembly constituencies in the Bansgaon Lok Sabha constituency. Since 2008, this assembly constituency is numbered 327 amongst 403 constituencies.

Members of the Legislative Assembly

Election results

2022

2017
Bharatiya Janta Party candidate Vimlesh Paswan won in last Assembly election of 2017 Uttar Pradesh Legislative Elections defeating Bahujan Samaj Party candidate Dharmendra Kumar by a margin of 22,873 votes.

References

External links
 

Assembly constituencies of Uttar Pradesh
Politics of Gorakhpur district